The Central American Unionist Party (Spanish: Partido Unionista Centroamericano - PUCA) is a center-right Nicaraguan political party.

PUCA was originally established as a cultural grouping advocating 'Central Americanization' in 1904. Renamed the Committee of State in 1944, it began to act as a political party after the Sandanistas gained power in 1979. PUCA received legal status after the 1984 elections. As of 2006, PUCA is in the Constitutionalist Liberal Party electoral alliance.

See also
Nicaraguan Revolution

References

Political parties established in 1904
Political parties in Nicaragua